The 2011 Copa Chevrolet Montana season will be the second Copa Chevrolet Montana season. It began on April 3 at the Interlagos and finished on November 6 at Velopark, after nine rounds.

Gramacho Racing Rafael Daniel claimed the title after finished 2nd in the final round of the season, two places ahed of Leandro Romera, who was beaten to the title by 8.5 points. Reigning Champion Diogo Pachenki finished third.

The season was marred by the death of Gustavo Sondermann in first race at Interlagos.

Teams and drivers
 All cars are powered by Chevrolet engines and use Chevrolet Montana chassis. All drivers were Brazilian-registered.

Race calendar and results
All rounds of the championship will support the Stock Car Brasil events. All races were held in Brazil.

Championship standings
Points were awarded as follows:

Drivers' Championship

Notes
† Gustavo Sondermann had a fatal accident in Interlagos; the race was halted and half points awarded.

Teams' Championship

References

External links
 Official website of the Copa Chevrolet Montana

Copa Chevrolet Montana
Stock Car Brasil